is the first single of Hello! Project solo artist, Kaori Iida. It was released on February 4, 2004, when she was still a member of the idol group, Morning Musume.

Track listing 
 
 Lyrics by Tokuko Miura, composition by Tsunku, arrangement by Chijou Maeno
 
 Lyrics and composition by Tsunku, arrangement by Chijou Maeno
 "Aegekai ni Dakerete (Instrumental)"

Performances

Television 
 Hello! Morning (February 1, 2004)
 AX MUSIC-TV (February 6, 2004)
 Pop Jam (February 7, 2004)

Concerts

Charts

References

External links 
 Aegekai ni Dakerete entry on the Up-Front works official website 

Kaori Iida songs
Zetima Records singles
2004 singles
Song recordings produced by Tsunku
2004 songs
Songs written by Tsunku